SLUNETA Ústí nad Labem is a professional basketball club based in Ústí nad Labem, Czech Republic. The club was founded in 1992 and currently plays in the top division NBL.

References

External links
Official website (in Czech)
Eurobasket.com Usti nad Labem Page

Basketball teams established in 1992
Basketball teams in the Czech Republic